Alan Leonel Bonansea (born 6 May 1996) is an Argentine professional footballer who plays as a forward for Santamarina in the Primera B Nacional.

Career
Bonansea started his career with Argentine Primera División side Lanús. In 2016, he departed on loan to sign for Central Norte of Torneo Federal B. He made three appearances for Central Norte before returning to Lanús. On 1 September 2017, Bonansea joined Primera B Nacional's Almagro on loan. He made his professional debut on 16 September in a home defeat to Brown, prior to scoring his first career goal two appearances later against Independiente Rivadavia. He netted seven times in total for them. A third loan away from Lanús was confirmed in July 2018, with Bonansea joining Mitre.

For Mitre, Bonansea scored five goals across seventeen appearances for the club as they placed eleventh in 2018–19. For the subsequent season, Bonansea spent a year on loan with Atlético de Rafaela; again, in the second tier. He scored in games against Brown, ex-club Almagro, Sarmiento and Gimnasia y Esgrima before the season's curtailment due to the COVID-19 pandemic. October 2020 saw Bonansea again depart Lanús on temporary terms, this time he headed to fellow Primera División outfit Rosario Central.

In late March 2021, the Croatian team NK Lokomotiva announced they signed Bonansea as a free agent. However, he returned to Argentina in July, signing with Chacarita Juniors. In January 2022, Bonansea joined Ecuadorian Serie A club Mushuc Runa. In March 2022, according to media reports, a loud argument broke out between Bonansea and the club's headcoach Geovanny Cumbicus. On 12 March 2022, the club announced that Bonansea had left the club "for personal reasons". Bonansea returned to his homeland, after leaving Mushuc Runa, and on 2 June 2022, he signed with Primera Nacional club Santamarina.

Career statistics
.

References

External links

1996 births
Living people
People from Rosario Department
Argentine footballers
Argentine expatriate footballers
Association football forwards
Club Atlético Lanús footballers
Central Norte players
Club Almagro players
Club Atlético Mitre footballers
Atlético de Rafaela footballers
Rosario Central footballers
NK Lokomotiva Zagreb players
Chacarita Juniors footballers
Mushuc Runa S.C. footballers
Club y Biblioteca Ramón Santamarina footballers
Argentine Primera División players
Primera Nacional players
Croatian Football League players
Ecuadorian Serie A players
Argentine expatriate sportspeople in Croatia
Argentine expatriate sportspeople in Ecuador
Expatriate footballers in Croatia
Expatriate footballers in Ecuador
Sportspeople from Santa Fe Province